Grand Lake can refer to at least 9 different lakes in the Canadian province of Nova Scotia:

 Grand Lake, Annapolis County (south of Annapolis Royal) at 
 Grand Lake, Cape Breton County (northwest of Sydney) at 
 Grand Lake, Cape Breton County (north of Louisbourg) at    
 Grand Lake, Halifax Regional Municipality (north of Sambro) at 
 Grand Lake,  (west of Sheet Harbour) at 
 Grand Lake, Halifax Regional Municipality (southeast of Meaghers Grant) at 
 Grand Lake, Halifax Regional Municipality (west of Porters Lake) at 
 Shubenacadie Grand Lake, Halifax County (west of Enfield) at 
 Grand Lake, Richmond County (on Isle Madame) at 

Lakes of Nova Scotia